Johnnie Walker (aka John Walker) is a former Australian racing driver, born in Adelaide, South Australia. He first raced in the early 1960s at Mallala in his Holden FE road car. After competing in the Australian Formula 2 Championship he graduated to Formula 5000 in 1972, driving an Elfin MR5 and a Matich A50 before switching to the Lola marque in late 1973.

Walker finished second in both the 1973 and 1975 Australian Drivers' Championships before breaking through to win the title in 1979 in his Lola T332 Chevrolet. He also won the 1979 Australian Grand Prix at Wanneroo Raceway.

In 1975 he was highly competitive in the Tasman Series going into the final round at Sandown as equal series leader with Warwick Brown and Graeme Lawrence. However he crashed his Lola on the first lap demolishing 50 metres of the horse racetrack's running rails.

Walker drove several touring car races for the Holden Dealer Team in 1975-1976 including co-driving with Colin Bond in the 1975 Hardie Ferodo 1000 where they placed third in a Holden Torana SL/R 5000 L34.

Career results
Results sourced from Driver Database.

Complete Tasman Series results
(key) (Races in bold indicate pole position) (Races in italics indicate fastest lap)

Complete Bathurst 500/1000 results

References 

 Australian Motor Racing Annual, 1972, page 40
 Racing Car News, November 1972, page 61
 Australian Competition Yearbook, 1974, pages 59, 75, 208
 Australian Competition Yearbook, 1975, pages 46, 70
 Australian Competition Yearbook, 1976, pages 65, 108, 117–120, 188
 Australian Competition Yearbook, 1977, pages 104-110
 Australian Competition Yearbook, 1978, page 115

Australian Formula 2 drivers
Australian Touring Car Championship drivers
Living people
Racing drivers from South Australia
Tasman Series drivers
Year of birth missing (living people)